The roving coral grouper (Plectropomus pessuliferus), also known as the spotted coral grouper, is a species of marine ray-finned fish, a grouper from the subfamily Epinephelinae which is part of the family Serranidae, which also includes the anthias and sea basses. It is found in the Indo-Pacific, although the Red Sea taxon, P. marisrubri, is regarded as a separate species by some authorities.

Description
The roving coral grouper has a body which is elongate and robust, with the standard length being 2.9 to 3.9 times the depth of the body. The preopercle is mostly rounded, with three large, downward pointing spines along the bottom half. The gill cover has two skin covered spines on either side of a naked central spine. The dorsal fin contains 7–8 spines and 10–12 soft rays while the anal fin contains 3 spines and 8 soft rays. The spiny part of the dorsal fin has a shorter base than the soft-rayed part. The caudal fin is a truncate in adults and emarginate in juveniles. The head, body, and fins are coloured brown to orange-red, with many small blue spots each with dark edges, some of these spots on thehead and flanks are elongated, normally vertically, with much less spotting on the lower body. There is often a blue ring around the eye, although this may be broken.

Distribution
The roving coral grouper is a widespread but quite rare species can be found in the Indo-Pacific, from the Red Sea, south along the East African coast to Mozambique and Madagascar and east across the Indian Ocean to the Coral Triangle of the Western Pacific Ocean.

Habitat and biology
These fishes live in coral reef, in shallow lagoon and seaward reefs, at a depth range of 25–147 m. This carnivorous species mainly feed on fishes and crustaceans. They sometimes engage in cooperative hunting with the giant moray (Gymnothorax javanicus), the humphead wrasse (Cheilinus undulatus), or the big blue octopus (Octopus cyanea).

Taxonomy
The roving coral grouper was first formally described as Plectropoma pessuliferum by the American ichthyologist Henry Weed Fowler (1878–1965) with the type locality given as Padang in Sumatra.

Some authorities recognise Plectropomus marisrubri, which Fishbase treats as a synonym of P. pessuliferus, as a valid species., while others as treat it as a subspecies of P. pessuliferus, P.p. maristrubri. Phylogenetic analyses showed that P. pessuliferus, which is a relatively small species and has with a distribution from the central Indian ocean to the Coral Triangle, is the sister species of the Leopard coral grouper (P. leopardus) and is not the closest relative of the Red Sea taxon, P.p. marisrubri.

Utilisation
The roving coral grouper is caught using spear, hand lines, gill nets and traps. In the Maldives, it is exported to southeast Asia for sale in the live reef fish trade and it is considered to be of high value.

References

Further reading
 Heemstra, P.C. and J.E. Randall, 1993. FAO Species Catalogue. Vol. 16. Groupers of the world (family Serranidae, subfamily Epinephelinae). An annotated and illustrated catalogue of the grouper, rockcod, hind, coral grouper and lyretail species known to date. Rome: FAO. FAO Fish. Synop. 125(16):382 p.
 Nouguier, J. and D. Refait (1990) Poissons de l'Océan Indien: les Iles Maldives., Réalisations Editoriales Pédagogiques, Paris. 304 p.
 Randall, J.E. and C. Anderson (1993) Annotated checklist of the epipelagic and shore fishes of the Maldives Islands., Ichthyol. Bull. of the J.L.B. Smith Inst. of Ichthyol. 59:47.
 Randall, J.E. and P.C. Heemstra (1991) Revision of Indo-Pacific groupers (Perciformes: Serranidae: Epinephelinae), with descriptions of five new species., Indo-Pacific Fishes (20):332 p.

External links
 Sous les Mers
 Liboupat2
 

roving coral grouper
roving coral grouper
Articles containing video clips